Common illegal drugs include marijuana and opiates. According to the 2011 United Nations Drug Report, the small population of Mauritius has a prevalence of opiate consumption of 0.91%,while 3.9% of the population are regular cannabis consumers. Drug smugglers also use Mauritius as a stop over especially during their voyage to the east coast of Africa.

History 
Consumption of illegal drugs on the island is not a recent phenomenon. Following the abolition of slavery in 1835, Mauritius, then a British colony, experienced an inflow of indentured labourers from India who introduced cannabis to the island. During the same period, immigrants from China brought opium to the island. These drugs mainly served traditional purposes and were not of serious public concern.

In the late 1970s, "brown sugar", a form of heroin, was introduced. Drug consumption deviated from its rather disciplined socio-cultural use and drug use proliferated. Mass drug proliferation was further aided by the development of extensive air and sea networks to Africa, South and Southeast Asia and Europe, combined with a free port.

With drug smuggling rising, local social centres noted a huge rise in the number of child and teenage addicts. Drug addiction in Mauritius has led to the proliferation of prostitution, thefts and armed attack.

Treatment 
Historically, the system convicted drug addicts rather than offering them treatment.

However, in January 2006, the methadone substitution therapy was implemented to help treat drug addicts. To emphasize its new strategy of treatment rather than conviction, the government made needle exchanges legal in November 2007, when it launched, in collaboration with the Collectif Urgence Toxida (CUT), a needle exchange programme.

The main centres responsible for treating drug addiction are:

	The National Centre for Rehabilitation of Drug Addicts
	Dr. Idrice Goomany Treatment Centre
	The Mauritius Sanathan Dharma Temples Federation
	Centre d'Accueil de Terre Rouge.

The carceral system also attempts to reform drug offenders through their Treatment and Rehabilitation Programme.

The Anti-Drug and Smuggling Unit 
The drug situation in Mauritius led to the restructuring of the Anti-Drug and Smuggling Unit (ADSU). The following responsibilities were given to the ADSU:

	Suppress the supply of illicit drugs
	Arrest drug offenders and have them prosecuted
	Locate and destroy all cannabis plantations
	Prevent and detect smuggling.

Besides fighting drug proliferation directly through the detection and prevention of drug offences, the ADSU jointly conducts sensitization campaigns, targeting different layers of the population, with the National Agency for the Treatment and Rehabilitation of Substance Abusers (NATReSA). In 2016, the Minister of Health criticized the National Agency for the Treatment And Rehabilitation of Substances Abuses for failing to prevent drug abuse.

References

External links 
 
 

 
Health in Mauritius
Mauritius
Mauritius